Marcelo Sarmiento (born November 3, 1979 in Córdoba) is an Argentine former professional footballer who last played for Unión de Santa Fe.

Playing career
Sarmiento spent most of his career in Argentina with Talleres de Córdoba, Olimpo and Argentinos Juniors. He had a brief spell on loan to Bulgarian team Litex Lovech and he spent the early part of the 2006–07 season on loan at English club Southampton. Sarmiento arrived at Southampton as a holding midfielder to organize the midfield but on 19 January 2007 he was released, having only made four appearances for the club, three in the Football League Cup and one in the FA Cup.

Sarmiento re-joined his previous club Argentinos Juniors on loan until June 2007 before joining Larissa in Greece on a free transfer on a two-year contract plus one year extension option. For the next two seasons, Sarmiento was a fundamental part of Larissa's squad, playing more than 60 games in total with the maroons, and being one of the key players in midfield.

In summer 2009, he transferred to Atromitos, rejoining his old Larissa coach Giorgos Donis. After a two-year stint at Atromitos, he left Greece to join the newly promoted Argentine Primera División side Unión in July 2011.

References

External links

Marcelo Sarmiento – Official Website
Guardian statistics
 Argentine Primera statistics

1979 births
Living people
Argentine footballers
Footballers from Córdoba, Argentina
Talleres de Córdoba footballers
Olimpo footballers
Argentinos Juniors footballers
PFC Litex Lovech players
Southampton F.C. players
Athlitiki Enosi Larissa F.C. players
Atromitos F.C. players
Unión de Santa Fe footballers
Super League Greece players
Argentine Primera División players
First Professional Football League (Bulgaria) players
Argentine expatriate footballers
Expatriate footballers in England
Expatriate footballers in Bulgaria
Expatriate footballers in Greece
Association football midfielders